The 1967 WANFL season was the 83rd season of the various incarnations of the Western Australian National Football League. Its most salient feature was the decline of East Fremantle, the league's most successful club, to its worst season since its inaugural 1898 season. Old Easts – having during the first two-thirds of the century never won fewer than ten matches in a season – won only seven and finished second-last after looking set for a still-worse record during the first fifteen rounds. The blue and whites suffered severely from a bad run of injuries and form lapses amongst senior players like Sorrell, Spriggs, Rogers and Casserly, plus a serious weakness in attack due to the loss of Bob Johnson. Despite regaining Austin Robertson and acquiring Johnson, Subiaco continued their disastrous form of late 1966 for their worst season since 1953, as the loss of Slater and injuries to Brian Sarre left them decrepit in the ruck and defence.

Future Hall of Fame coach John Todd had his first major success, lifting 1965 and 1966 wooden spooners South Fremantle to their third finals berth and first victory since 1956. Early in the season the red and whites were the nearest rivals to East Perth, who won fifteen of their first sixteen matches before fading. Perth had been a 2/1 flag favourite before the season started but lost six of their first eleven matches before coming back to always have the edge on East Perth during August and September. Claremont, after a frustrating 1966, recovered from a disastrous start before being denied a finals berth in the last few minutes.

A lowlight was a career-ending knee injury to champion West Perth centre half-back Brian France on 8 July against East Fremantle. At the time France had polled eighteen votes in the Sandover Medal and was still within one vote of tying despite playing only thirteen full games.

Home-and-away season

Round 1

Round 2

Round 3

Round 4

Round 5

Round 6

Round 7

Round 8

Round 9 (Foundation Day)

Round 10

Round 11

Round 12

Round 13

Round 14

Round 15

Interstate match

Round 16

Round 17

Round 18

Round 19

Round 20

Round 21

Ladder

Finals

First semi-final

Second semi-final

Preliminary final

Grand Final

Notes
In Round 14 of the 1942 under-age competition, Claremont were also scoreless in the second and third quarters against East Perth.

References

External links
Official WAFL website
Western Australian National Football League (WANFL), 1967

West Australian Football League seasons
WANFL